Borges  (or )  is a Portuguese and Spanish surname. Jorge Luis Borges, the most notable person with this name, notes that his family name, like Burgess in English, means "of the town", "bourgeois".

Notable people with the surname include:
António Borges (1949–2013), Portuguese economist and banker
António Borges (equestrian) (1906–2011), Portuguese horse rider
Carlos Borges (1932–2014), Uruguayan footballer
Celso Borges (born 1988), Costa Rican footballer
Fernanda Borges, East Timorese politician
Francisco L. Borges (born 1951), American politician born in Cape Verde
Graciela Borges (born 1941), Argentine actress
Gustavo Borges (born 1972), Brazilian swimmer
Hernâni Borges (born 1981), Cape Verdean footballer
Humberlito Borges Teixeira (born  1980), Brazilian footballer
Jorge Guillermo Borges Haslam, Argentine writer
Jorge Luis Borges (1899–1986), Argentine writer
José Borges, Cuban baseball player
Julio Borges (born 1969), Venezuelan politician
Lô Borges (born 1952), Brazilian songwriter, singer, and guitarist
Lucas Borges (born 1980), Argentine rugby player
Norah Borges (1901–1998), Argentine artist
Phil Borges (born 1942), photographer
Raúl Borges (1882–1967), Venezuelan pedagogue, guitarist and composer
Ron Borges, American sportswriter
Rowllin Borges (born 1992), Indian footballer 
Tristan Borges (born 1998), Canadian soccer player
Víctor Borges (born 1955), Cape Verdean foreign minister
Wágner de Andrade Borges (born 1987), Brazilian footballer
Willian Borges da Silva (born 1988), Brazilian footballer

See also
Borges (disambiguation)
Burges, English surname
Burgess (surname), English surname
Borge (surname), Danish surname

References

Portuguese-language surnames
Spanish-language surnames